Drillia regia is a species of sea snail, a marine gastropod mollusk in the family Drilliidae.

The database Gastropods.com regards this species as a synonym of Neodrillia enna (W.H. Dall, 1918), in turn regarded by WoRMS as a synonym of Drillia enna <small>(W.H. Dall, 1918)</small.

Description
The length of the shell varies between 25 mm and 60 mm.

Distribution
This species occurs in the Southwestern Pacific and off the Philippines.

References

 Tippett D.L. (2006a) Taxonomic notes on some Indo-Pacific and West African Drillia species (Conoidea: Drillidae). Iberus, 24, 13–21. page(s): 18–19
  Tucker, J.K. 2004 Catalog of recent and fossil turrids (Mollusca: Gastropoda). Zootaxa 682:1–1295

External links
 
 Specimen at MNHN, Paris

regia
Gastropods described in 1970